Elieser Marrero (born November 17, 1973), is a former Major League Baseball player. Marrero started his career as a catcher, but spent time at first base, third base and in the outfield.

Playing career

Marrero was selected in the third round of the June 1993 MLB draft by the St. Louis Cardinals. He missed much of the 2000 season due to thyroid cancer. During that time, he lost his job as the starting catcher for the Cardinals, so when he returned he started logging time in the outfield and at first, in addition to occasional duty behind the plate.  While with the Cardinals, Marrero caught Bud Smith's no-hitter on September 3, 2001.

The Cardinals traded Marrero to the Atlanta Braves in December 2003 as part of a package for pitchers Jason Marquis and rookie prospect Adam Wainwright, where he hit .415 against left-handed pitchers as a platoon outfielder. Following the 2004 season, the Braves dealt him to the Kansas City Royals, who were in need of a power-hitting corner outfielder, in exchange for minor-league pitcher Jorge Vasquez. He saw action at all three outfield positions and first base, but hit only .159 in 32 games. The Royals designated him for assignment on May 31, 2005, giving them 10 days to trade or release him. On June 8, the Royals traded him to the Baltimore Orioles for minor-league infielder Peter Maestrales.

On June 9, 2006, while playing for the AAA affiliate of the Colorado Rockies, Marrero was traded to the New York Mets for infielder Kaz Matsui. On July 2, 2006, Marrero saw his first Major League action at third base, playing two innings there for the Mets. On August 8, 2006, he was designated for assignment. On November 28, 2006, Marrero was signed to a minor league deal by the St. Louis Cardinals. On May 21, 2007, Marrero was released by the Memphis Redbirds, the Cardinals' Triple-A affiliate, after just one game.

Post-playing career
In July 2011, Marrero was named the batting coach of the Billings Mustangs. Marrero was the manager of the Arizona League Reds for the 2013 season. On December 1, 2014, Marrero was named manager of the Reds Class A-Advanced affiliate, the Daytona Tortugas. Marrero was with the Tortugas until late in the 2017 season.

Personal life
Marrero is the uncle of professional baseball players Chris Marrero and Deven Marrero.

Marrero's son Elih was a 29th round pick by the Cincinnati Reds in the 2015 MLB draft, but he elected to play college baseball at Mississippi State. Elih later transferred to St. Thomas University in Florida, and was selected by the Boston Red Sox in the eighth round of the 2018 MLB draft.

References

External links
, or Retrosheet

1973 births
Living people
Major League Baseball catchers
Major League Baseball outfielders
Major League Baseball players from Cuba
Cuban expatriate baseball players in the United States
St. Louis Cardinals players
Atlanta Braves players
Baltimore Orioles players
Kansas City Royals players
Colorado Rockies players
New York Mets players
Memphis Redbirds players
Greenville Braves players
Richmond Braves players
Arkansas Travelers players
St. Petersburg Cardinals players
Savannah Cardinals players
Louisville Redbirds players
Johnson City Cardinals players
Minor league baseball managers
Baseball players from Havana
Cuban emigrants to the United States
Leones de Ponce players
Cuban expatriate baseball players in Puerto Rico
Coral Gables Senior High School alumni